
This is a list of the National Register of Historic Places listings in Southeast Denver, Colorado.

This is intended to be a complete list of the properties and districts on the National Register of Historic Places in southeastern Denver, Colorado, United States. Southeast Denver is defined as being all of the city east of the South Platte River and south of Sixth Avenue. The locations of National Register properties and districts may be seen in an online map.

There are 307 properties and districts listed on the National Register in Denver. Southeast Denver includes 46 of these properties and districts, including 3 that extend into other regions; the city's remaining properties and districts are listed elsewhere.  Another 2 properties in Southeast Denver were once listed but have been removed.

Current listings

|}

Former listings

|}

See also
List of National Historic Landmarks in Colorado
National Register of Historic Places listings in Denver, Colorado

References

Southeast